Grand Blois is a village in the Cavaellon commune of the Aquin Arrondissement, in the Sud department of Haiti. It is located on a peninsula. Bordered to the east by the Baie du Mesle and to the west by the Baie des Flamands.

References

Populated places in Sud (department)